Spilonota terenia is a species of moth of the family Tortricidae first described by Józef Razowski in 2013. It is found on Seram Island in Indonesia. The habitat consists of lower and upper montane forests.

The wingspan is about 16 mm. The forewings are rust brown, but paler terminally with browner suffusions and strigulae (fine streaks). The hindwings are grey with a slight brown admixture.

Etymology
The specific name refers to the colouration of the species and is derived from Greek teren (meaning smooth).

References

Moths described in 2013
Eucosmini